WarBirds is a series of massively multiplayer online and offline World War II combat flight simulation video games originally developed by Interactive Creations of Grapevine and published by iEntertainment Network  in 1995. The game includes an air combat flight simulator as well as a simulator for tanks and other ground vehicles and inspired a fan cult and conventions, and a book titled WarBirds: The Story So Far. 

Following 1999's WarBirds II, WarBirds III was released for Mac and PC in 2002. WarBirds III was a runner-up for GameSpots annual "Best Simulation on PC" award, which went to Flanker 2.5. WarBirds: The Mighty Eight was released in 2007. A more recent version, WarBirds 2008, includes tanks, trucks, halftracks, new aircraft, and new graphics. WarBirds: Dogfights was released in 2010.

In 1999, some of the original development team, including John "Killer" MacQueen, Rodney "Hatch" Hodge, and Chris "Mo" Sherland, went on to form Cornered Rat Software where they developed WWII Online. Others followed Dale "HiTech" Addink to form HiTech Creations and develop Aces High.

References

External links
 Official website
 Old official website (archived)
 WarBirds series at MobyGames

1995 video games
MacOS games
Massively multiplayer online games
Video game franchises introduced in 1995
Windows games
World War II flight simulation video games